Florian Hart (born 11 May 1990) is an Austrian footballer who currently plays for SV Mattersburg. He formerly played for Danish Superliga side SønderjyskE.

References

1990 births
Living people
Austrian footballers
Austria youth international footballers
LASK players
SønderjyskE Fodbold players
SV Grödig players
SV Ried players
Austrian Football Bundesliga players
2. Liga (Austria) players
Danish Superliga players
Austrian expatriate footballers
Expatriate men's footballers in Denmark
Austrian expatriate sportspeople in Denmark
Association football midfielders
Association football defenders